Mexican singer Kenia Os has released one studio albums, three extended plays, one live album and 16 singles (as well as ten as a featured artist).

Studio albums

Extended plays

Singles

As lead artist

Promotional singles

As featured artist

Other certified songs

References

Discographies of Mexican artists